Two ships of the Royal Navy has borne the name HMS Anzac, after the Australian and New Zealand Army Corps (ANZAC). Another was planned but never completed:

 HMS Anzac, a trawler hired by the Admiralty in 1916 to serve as an auxiliary minesweeper. She was renamed  in 1917, and remained in service until 1919
  was a  launched in 1917, transferred to the Royal Australian Navy in 1919 as HMAS Anzac and sold in 1935.

See also
 

Royal Navy ship names